William Arnold Bevan, Sr. (March 26, 1913 – August 26, 1975) was an American football player and coach.  He played college football at the University of Minnesota and was a consensus selection at the guard position on the 1934 College Football All-America Team.

Biography
He grew up in St. Paul, Minnesota, and graduated from St. Paul Central High School.  He then enrolled at the University of Minnesota, where he was a member of the Minnesota Golden Gophers football team under head coach Bernie Bierman.  He played at the guard position on Minnesota teams that were undefeated for two consecutive seasons from 1933 to 1934 and was one of four first-team All-Americans on the 1934 Minnesota team that has been recognized as Minnesota's first national championship team. He was a consensus first-team selection for the 1934 College Football All-America Team.   He was also a boxer who won the Big Ten Conference boxing championship in the light heavyweight class.

After leaving Minnesota, Bevan was a football coach at Iowa State University, Tulane University, Dartmouth College, and the University of Pittsburgh.  During World War II, he served in the United States Army and attained the rank of lieutenant colonel.  After the war, Bevan pursued a career in business.  He also volunteered as a coach at Chisago City High School Chisago City, Minnesota, Shattuck, and Carleton College. He died in 1975.

References

1913 births
1975 deaths
American football guards
Minnesota Golden Gophers football players
All-American college football players
Players of American football from Minnesota
Iowa State Cyclones football coaches
Tulane Green Wave football coaches
Dartmouth Big Green football coaches
United States Army personnel of World War II
United States Army colonels